De Langste Reis  is a 1997 Dutch crime film directed by Pieter Verhoeff. The film deals with a kidnapping and Stockholm syndrome.

Cast
Eric van der Donk	... 	Schuyt
Han Kerkhoffs	... 	Cop
Johan Leysen	... 	Mertens
Mads Wittermans

External links 
 

1997 films
1997 crime films
1990s Dutch-language films
Films directed by Pieter Verhoeff
Films shot in the Netherlands
Dutch crime films